All-Time Greatest Hits is a 3 disc compilation album issued in 1993 by CEMA Special Markets, containing single A-sides released between 1966 and 1978. This album is notable because of the presence of several single-only releases that have not been widely available on CD: "Oklahoma Sunday Morning" (1971), "Manhattan Kansas" (1972), "Wherefore and Why" (1973) and "God Must Have Blessed America" (1977).

Track listing
Disc 1:

 "Rhinestone Cowboy" (Larry Weiss)
 "By The Time I Get To Phoenix" (Jimmy Webb)
 "It's Only Make Believe" (Conway Twitty, Jack Nance)
 "Burning Bridges" (Walter Scott)
 "I Wanna Live" (John D. Loudermilk)
 "I'm Gonna Love You" (Micheal Smotherman)
 "Southern Nights" (Allen Toussaint)
 "Houston (I'm Comin' To See You)" (David Paich)
 "Try A Little Kindness" (Curt Sapaugh, Bobby Austin)
 "Where's The Playground Susie" (Jimmy Webb)
 "Hey Little One" (Dorsey Burnette, Barry De Vorzon)
 "Manhattan Kansas" (Allen)

Disc 2:

 "Gentle On My Mind" (John Hartford)
 "Dream Baby (How Long Must I Dream)" (Cindy Walker)
 "True Grit" (Don Black, Elmer Bernstein)
 "Oh Happy Day" (Edwin Hawkins)
 "Sunflower" (Neil Diamond)
 "It's A Sin When You Love Somebody" (Jimmy Webb)
 "Country Boy (You Got Your Feet In LA)" (Dennis Lambert, Brian Potter)
 "Wichita Lineman" (Jimmy Webb)
 "All I Have To Do Is Dream" (with Bobbie Gentry) (Boudleaux Bryant)
 "Galveston" (Jimmy Webb)
 "Everything A Man Could Ever Need" (Mac Davis)
 "Oklahoma Sunday Morning" (T. Macauley, H. Hazlewood)

Disc 3:

 "Honey Come Back" (Jimmy Webb)
 "Dreams of the Everyday Housewife" (Chris Gantry)
 "The Last Time I Saw Her" (Gordon Lightfoot)
 "Don't Pull Your Love/Then You Can Tell Me Goodbye" (Lambert, Potter, Loudermilk)
 "See You On Sunday" (Dennis Lambert, Brian Potter)
 "Let It Be Me" (with Bobbie Gentry) (Gilbert Bécaud, Mann Curtis, Pierre Delanoë)
 "Bonaparte's Retreat" (Pee Wee King)
 "Wherefore And Why" (Gordon Lightfoot)
 "I Will Never Pass This Way Again" (Ronnie Gaylord)
 "God Must Have Blessed America" (Allen Toussaint)
 "Can You Fool" (Micheal Smotherman)

Production
Package design by Jerry Wiant Design
Manufactured in Canada

Reception

References

1993 compilation albums
Glen Campbell compilation albums